{{DISPLAYTITLE:C4-Benzenes}}
The C4-benzenes are a class of organic aromatic compounds which contain a benzene ring and four other carbon atoms. There are three tetramethylbenzenes, six dimethylethylbenzenes, three diethylbenzenes, three isopropylmethylbenzenes, three n-propylmethylbenzenes and four butylbenzenes. The saturated compounds have formula C10H14 and molecular weight 134.22 g/mol. C4-benzenes are found in petroleum. Petrol (gasoline) can contain 5-8% C4-benzenes.

Cymenes
o-Cymene
m-Cymene
p-Cymene

Tetramethylbenzenes
prehnitene
isodurene
durene

Other

Saturated
1,2,3-Ethyldimethylbenzene
1,2,4-Ethyldimethylbenzene
1,2,5-Ethyldimethylbenzene
1,2,6-Ethyldimethylbenzene
1,3,4-Ethyldimethylbenzene
1,2,5-Ethyldimethylbenzene
ortho-diethylbenzene
meta-diethylbenzene
para-diethylbenzene
1,2-Propylmethylbenzene
1,3-Propylmethylbenzene
1,4-Propylmethylbenzene
n-Butylbenzene
sec-Butylbenzene
tert-Butylbenzene
Isobutylbenzene

Unsaturated
Divinylbenzene

References

Alkylbenzenes
 
Benzene derivatives